The University of the Pacific, is a public, national, coeducational university based primarily in the city of Buenaventura, Valle del Cauca, Colombia.  The university also has several satellite campuses across the Pacific Region in the cities of Guapi in the Cauca Department and Tumaco in the Nariño Department.

See also

 List of universities in Colombia

External links
 University of the Pacific official site 

Universities and colleges in Colombia
Educational institutions established in 1988
University of the Pacific
1988 establishments in Colombia
Buildings and structures in Cauca Department
Buildings and structures in Nariño Department